Praxeliopsis is a genus of plants in the tribe Eupatorieae within the family Asteraceae.

Species
The only known species is Praxeliopsis mattogrossensis, native to Bolivia and to the State of Mato Grosso in Brazil.

References

Monotypic Asteraceae genera
Flora of South America
Eupatorieae